The McLaren M15 was an open-wheel race car designed and built by the McLaren team for a single season of competition in 1970, and was their first attempt at making an Indy car. It was unsuccessful, and failed to qualify for the 1970 Indianapolis 500. It was later replaced by the more successful McLaren M16, which went on to win three Indy 500s; in 1972, 1974 and 1976.

References

Indianapolis 500
American Championship racing cars